Jamal Ali Hamza (born 2 February 1956) is an Iraqi football midfielder who played for Iraq in the 1986 FIFA World Cup. He also played for and now coaches Al Minaa.

Jamal Ali played for the Iraqi Olympic team at the 1980 Olympics in Moscow. He was later turned into a left back.

He was selected by Brazilian coach Evaristo de Macedo in Iraq's 1986 World Cup squad but he was also one of four squad members who did not get an appearance in Mexico.

He made 17 international appearances for Iraq, and was part of the Iraqi B team that finished second to South Korea in the 1977 Merdeka Cup.

Managerial statistics

References

External links
 

1956 births
Iraqi footballers
Iraq international footballers
Association football midfielders
Talaba SC players
1986 FIFA World Cup players
Living people
Olympic footballers of Iraq
Footballers at the 1980 Summer Olympics
Al-Talaba SC players
Al-Mina'a SC managers
Iraqi football managers